Andreas Felix von Oefele (17 May 1706 – 17 February 1780) was a German historian and librarian.

Von Oefele was born in Munich, the son of an innkeeper. He attended the Jesuit secondary school "Wilhelmsgymnasium" and continued his studies of Law, history and theology at the universities of Ingolstadt and Leuven. In 1723, he began his 10 volume work "Lebensgeschichten der gelehrtesten Männer Bayerns" (Life stories of the most learned men of Bavaria). In 1727, he became librarian of the German national Library in Leuven, in 1734, he was appointed educator of the Bavarian Princes Clemens und Max, sons of Prince Ferdinand Maria.

When in 1746 the Bavarian Chancellor Franz Xaver Josef von Unertl had to give up control of the court library and the Secret Archives, Oefele was created head of the Court and State Library as "Electoral Councillor, Bibliothecarius and Antiquarius" by Elector Max III. Joseph. This office he relinquished only in 1778, when he had to retire for health reasons. In 1759, he was appointed member of the Bavarian Academy of Sciences.  He died in Munich.
 
Andreas Felix von Oefele's papers are preserved in the Bayerische Staatsbibliothek.

Further reading
 Langheiter, Alexander: "Andreas Felix von Oefele". In: Wurst, Jürgen & Langheiter, Alexander (eds.): Monachia. München: Städtische Galerie im Lenbachhaus, 2005; p. 54. 
 Westenrieder, Lorenz von: Zum Andenken des Andreas Felix von Oefele. München 1780.

External links 
CV of Andreas Felix Oefele in the Allgemeine Deutsche Biographie

1706 births
1780 deaths
18th-century German historians
German librarians
Writers from Munich
German male non-fiction writers